Tim Doyle is an American television producer and television writer. His credits include Dinosaurs, Roseanne, Grace Under Fire, Ellen, Sports Night, Still Standing, The Big Bang Theory, Better Off Ted, Rules of Engagement, Last Man Standing, and creator of The Kids Are Alright.

Doyle grew up in Glendale, California. He is married to Ellen Svaco Doyle. They have one child together.

Doyle created The Kids Are Alright, an American sitcom television series that premiered on October 16, 2018, on ABC. The series is semi-autobiographical, following a Catholic family with eight sons in the Los Angeles area during the early 1970s. Although lasting only one season this series earned strong critical reviews, a 97% on Rotten Tomatoes and a 2019 Best Comedy Episode nomination from the Writers Guild of America for its pilot script by Doyle. All 23 episodes are currently streaming on Hulu.  

He is an alumnus of USC School of Cinematic Arts.

Doyle has gained a reputation as a sitcom "showrunner" brought in when the original showrunners have been fired from troubled shows, helping the series to recover and accumulate enough episodes for syndication.

Doyle is also widely credited with originating the term "bay leaf", a term of art in television comedy. A bay leaf is material written into a script with the explicit intention that it would be removed later, either in subsequent drafts or in editing of the finished episode.  Bay leaves are generally used to address unwanted network and studio notes, the "heavy-handed suggestions given by studio executives".

Filmography

Film

Television

References

External links

Television producers from California
American television writers
American male television writers
People from Glendale, California
USC School of Cinematic Arts alumni
Living people
1959 births
Screenwriters from California